Codename was a short-lived British television series produced by the BBC in 1970.

An espionage thriller series, Codename recounted the activities of a secret organisation, MI17, being run from a residential hall at Cambridge University. The programme, lasting for one series of thirteen episodes, was produced by Gerard Glaister and starred Clifford Evans, Alexandra Bastedo, Anthony Valentine and Brian Peck. It was preceded by a one-off pilot play, with a different cast.

The leads were well known from other series when this series was originally transmitted, Valentine from Callan, Bastedo from The Champions and Evans from The Power Game, and the first episode featured on the cover of the Radio Times. However, the show failed to capture the public imagination, and no further series were made.

No episodes survive in the BBC archive, though there is a recording of the pilot.

External links
 

BBC television dramas
Espionage television series
1970s British drama television series
1970 British television series debuts
1970 British television series endings
British college television series